Abdyl bey Ypi (1876–1920) was an Albanian politician and one of the main initiators of the Congress of Lushnjë.

Life 
Abdyl Ypi was born in Kolonjë, then part of the Vilayet of Janina, in present-day Albania. He was a political figure of the National Movement active during the first two decades of the 20th century. A well-known turkophile, he participated in the Young Turks movement and subsequently in July 1908 became chairman of the Albanian Club of Istanbul.  After World War I, Ypi opposed the pro-capitalist political orientation of the Durrës Government formed in December 1918, propagating the overthrow of this government and the organization of the Congress of Lushnjë.  He held various official posts such as that of the Sub-prefect of Korçë, the Prefect of Durrës, the Governor of Konica and Kolonjë. Ypi was killed in the city of Durrës on January 15, 1920.

References

1876 births
1920 deaths
Albanian politicians
People from Kolonjë
Abdyl
Assassinated Albanian politicians
Albanians from the Ottoman Empire